Events from the year 1472 in Ireland.

Incumbent
Lord: Edward IV

Events
 Robert FitzEustace and John Taxton appointed Joint Lord Chancellors of Ireland

Deaths

References